Oleksandr Volodymyrovych Konovaliuk (born 1 May 1978) is a Ukrainian rower. He competed in the Men's eight event at the 2012 Summer Olympics.

References

External links
 

1978 births
Living people
Ukrainian male rowers
Olympic rowers of Ukraine
Rowers at the 2012 Summer Olympics
Coxswains (rowing)
Sportspeople from Kherson